Tehama County (Wintun for "high water") is a county located in the northern part of the U.S. state of California. As of the 2020 census, the population was 65,829. The county seat and largest city is Red Bluff.

Tehama County comprises the Red Bluff, California micropolitan statistical area, which is also included in the Redding-Red Bluff, California combined statistical area. The county is bisected by the Sacramento River.

Etymology
The county is named for the City of Tehama. Tehama is most commonly believed to be derived from the Wintun word for "high water". Others definitions of native origin that have been proposed such as "low land", "salmon", "mother nature" or "shallow". A less accepted theory proposes the names origin is tejamanil, shingle in Spanish.

History
Tehama County was formed from parts of Butte, Colusa, and Shasta Counties in 1856.

The first permanent non-indigenous settlers in the area that is now Tehama County were Robert Hasty Thomes, Albert Gallatin Toomes, William George Chard, and Job Francis Dye.  The four men were each given land grants by the government of Mexico in 1844.  Thomes received Rancho Saucos,  Toomes received Rancho Rio de los Molinos, Chard received Rancho Las Flores, and Dye received Rancho Primer Cañon o Rio de Los Berrendos.  Later in the same year Josiah Belden received Rancho Barranca Colorado.

Famous early figures include Kit Carson, who took part in a fight that gave name to Bloody Island and Battle Creek, Jedediah Smith, John C. Fremont, and William B. Ide, the first and only president of the California Republic.

The history of Tehama County includes the January 1886 relocation of Red Bluff's Chinese population, followed by the August 1886 torching of Red Bluff's Chinatown by alleged arsonists. The January 29th, 1886 edition of The Daily Alta detailed 'The Anti-Coolie Move' and confirms that a secret anti-Chinese meeting was convened in the town of Tehama, and an organization established to relocate the estimated 2,000 Chinese in and around Vina. Secret daily anti-Chinese caucuses in Red Bluff were also held.

Geography
Watercourses in Tehama County include Dye Creek and Payne's Creek. The county is intersected by Sacramento River. A small part of Lassen Volcanic National Park extends into the northeast corner of the county. The highest point of the county is Brokeoff Mountain (9,235 feet).

Adjacent counties
 Shasta County - north
 Plumas County - northeast
 Butte County - east
 Glenn County - south
 Mendocino County - southwest
 Trinity County - west

National protected areas
 Lassen National Forest (part)
 Lassen Volcanic National Park (part)
 Mendocino National Forest (part)
 Sacramento River National Wildlife Refuge (part)
 Shasta–Trinity National Forest (part)

Transportation

Major highways
 Interstate 5
 State Route 32
 State Route 36
 State Route 89
 State Route 99

Public transportation
Tehama Rural Area Express (TRAX) operates local service in Red Bluff and service to Los Molinos and Corning.
Greyhound buses stop in Red Bluff.

Airports
Red Bluff Municipal Airport and Corning Municipal Airport are two general aviation airports.

Crime 

The following table includes the number of incidents reported and the rate per 1,000 persons for each type of offense.

Cities by population and crime rates

Demographics

2020 census

Note: the US Census treats Hispanic/Latino as an ethnic category. This table excludes Latinos from the racial categories and assigns them to a separate category. Hispanics/Latinos can be of any race.

2011

Places by population, race, and income

2010 Census
The 2010 United States Census reported that Tehama County had a population of 63,463. The racial makeup of Tehama County was 51,721 (81.5%) White, 406 (0.6%) African American, 1,644 (2.6%) Native American, 656 (1.0%) Asian, 76 (0.1%) Pacific Islander, 6,258 (9.9%) from other races, and 2,702 (4.3%) from two or more races. Hispanic or Latino of any race were 13,906 persons (21.9%).

2000 Census

As of the census of 2000, there were 56,039 people, 21,013 households, and 14,898 families residing in the county. The population density was 19 people per square mile (7/km2). There were 23,547 housing units at an average density of 8 per square mile (3/km2). The racial makeup of the county was 84.8% White, 0.6% Black or African American, 2.1% Native American, 0.8% Asian, 0.1% Pacific Islander, 8.3% from other races, and 3.4% from two or more races. 15.8% of the population were Hispanic or Latino of any race. 14.4% were of German, 11.0% English, 9.6% Irish and 9.5% American ancestry according to the 2000 United States Census. 86.0% spoke English and 13.0% Spanish as their first language.

There were 21,013 households, out of which 32.9% had children under the age of 18 living with them, 54.6% were married couples living together, 11.6% had a female householder with no husband present, and 29.1% were non-families. 24.0% of all households were made up of individuals, and 11.5% had someone living alone who was 65 years of age or older. The average household size was 2.62 and the average family size was 3.08.

In the county, the population was spread out, with 27.4% under the age of 18, 7.8% from 18 to 24, 25.7% from 25 to 44, 23.2% from 45 to 64, and 15.9% who were 65 years of age or older. The median age was 38 years. For every 100 females there were 97.7 males. For every 100 females age 18 and over, there were 95.0 males.

The median income for a household in the county was $31,206, and the median income for a family was $37,277. Males had a median income of $30,872 versus $22,864 for females. The per capita income for the county was $15,793. About 13.0% of families and 17.3% of the population were below the poverty line, including 24.0% of those under age 18 and 9.2% of those age 65 or over.

Politics

Voter registration statistics

Cities by population and voter registration

Overview 
Tehama is a strongly Republican county in Presidential and congressional elections. The last Democrat to win a majority in the county was Jimmy Carter in 1976. Bill Clinton won a plurality in 1992.

On November 4, 2008, Tehama County voted 72.7% for Proposition 8, which amended the California Constitution to ban same-sex marriages.

Communities

Cities
Corning
Red Bluff
Tehama

Unincorporated communities
Kirkwood
Mill Creek
Mineral

Census-designated places

Bend
Dales
Flournoy
Gerber
Lake California
Las Flores
Los Molinos
Manton
Mineral CDP
Paskenta
Paynes Creek
Proberta
Rancho Tehama
Richfield
Vina

Population ranking

The population ranking of the following table is based on the 2020 census of Tehama County.

† county seat

See also 
 Hiking trails in Tehama County
 National Register of Historic Places listings in Tehama County, California
 Orland Buttes

Notes

References

External links

 
1856 establishments in California
California counties
Populated places established in 1856
Sacramento Valley
Shasta Cascade